Mana Island Airport  is an airport serving Mana Island, one of the Mamanuca Islands in Fiji.

Airlines and destinations
Pacific Island Air has daily scheduled aeroplane flights between Nadi and Mana Island Airport, using a six-passenger Britten-Norman Islander aeroplane. They also offer seaplane and helicopter transfers between Nadi and the island.

References

External links
 

Airports in Fiji
Mamanuca Islands